Gay Purr-ee is a 1962 American animated musical film produced by United Productions of America and released by Warner Bros. It features the voice of Judy Garland in her only animated-film role, as well as Robert Goulet in his first feature film. The film received positive reviews, but was a box office failure. It is also the first animated feature film to be theatrically released by Warner Bros, and the second and final of 2 animated films by UPA.

Plot
The story is set in 1895 France and takes place predominantly in Paris. However, it begins on a farm in rural Provence. The lovely cat Mewsette and the accomplished but shy mouser Jaune Tom are in love, until the former is frustrated with his plebeian ways (and those of the farm), to the point of calling him a "clumsy country clod". Inspired by the human Jeanette's stories of glamour and sophistication in Paris, Mewsette runs away by taking a train to the big city, where she encounters the slick con-cat Meowrice. Taking advantage of the country kitty's naivete, he puts her in the care of the sultry Madame Henrietta Reubens-Chatte, who promises to turn Mewsette into a dainty debutante known as "The Belle of all Paris". Unbeknownst to Mewsette, Meowrice is grooming her to be the mail-order bride of a rich American cat in Pittsburgh known as "Mr. Henry Phtt". Meanwhile, Jaune Tom and his sidekick Robespierre arrive in Paris, searching for Mewsette.

Training does not go well. Just as Mewsette is about to give up and return to the farm, Meowrice takes her out to see the cat side of Paris, the Eiffel Tower, the Champs-Élysées and the Mewlon Rouge and then take a buggy ride back home. Reinvigorated, she returns to her studies. Jaune Tom and Robespierre arrive just at that moment but get waylaid by one of Meowrice's shadowy cat henchmen and barely escape drowning in Paris's famous labyrinthine sewers. By coincidence, Jaune Tom displays his incredible mouse-hunting skills in front of Meowrice (known as "Virtue-Mousety"), who sees a money-making opportunity, gets them drunk, and sells them as mousers to a ship bound for Alaska. On the ship, Robespierre consoles a depressed Jaune Tom, telling him that any problem, regardless of size, can be broken up into manageable pieces, by remarking that even the mighty ocean is made up of little drops of water. Jaune Tom has a vision of Mewsette singing about how no problem is unconquerable, and the importance of never giving up.

Mewsette finishes her training and is now lovely enough to impress even Meowrice, who commissions a series of paintings of her by such famous artists as Claude Monet, Henri de Toulouse-Lautrec, Georges Seurat, Henri Rousseau, Amedeo Modigliani, Vincent van Gogh, Edgar Degas, Auguste Renoir, Paul Cézanne, Paul Gauguin and Pablo Picasso (an opportunity for the animators to indulge in some artistic parodies), so that he can send them to Mr. Phtt. Meowrice quietly writes a check to pay his "sister", Madame Reubens-Chatte (using disappearing ink, so that the check is worthless), and takes Mewsette to his hideout in Notre Dame. There, he reveals his plan to ship her to America and tries to coerce her to enter a luggage crate, but after seeing a portrait of Mr. Phtt depicting him as fat and old, she manages to escape Meowrice and his sidekicks. In the resulting chase scene, she leads them to a bulldog, who injures Meowrice badly enough to put him out of action for six weeks. Meanwhile, his sycophants (who are nowhere near as intelligent as he is) comb the city without success, searching for Mewsette.

Meanwhile, not long after they reach Alaska (a howling wilderness of snow), Jaune Tom and Robespierre strike gold thanks to the former's mouse-hunting skills. Now wealthy, the two cats hurry back to Paris.

A disillusioned and homeless Mewsette wanders around the streets of Paris and stops atop a bridge over the river, considering ending her misery, but she is captured by Meowrice and his sidekicks. She is taken to the Gare du Nord railway station, en route to a boat to America, and all hope seems lost, when Jaune Tom and Robespierre arrive. They have been aided by Madame Reubens-Chatte, who is outraged that her own "brother" double-crossed her and tears up the worthless check. In a humorously over-the-top fight scene inside the boxcar of a moving train, the three heroes defeat Meowrice and pack him into the crate intended for Mewsette instead of kicking him off the train, doubtless that this will be a nasty surprise for Mr. Phtt. The film concludes with Mewsette, Jaune Tom and Robespierre enjoying the high life in Paris that Mewsette was seeking when she left home.

Voice cast
 Judy Garland as Mewsette, a beautiful white Turkish Angora and Jaune Tom's girlfriend. While she is idealistic and naive, she is kind and demure, and believes strongly in herself.
 Robert Goulet as Jaune Tom, a handsome orange tabby cat and expert mouse catcher. While he is hotheaded and not too bright, he is selfless, devoted, brave, and strong-willed.
 Red Buttons as Robespierre, a young black and white cat and Jaune Tom's friend. While he is sometimes inconsiderate and reckless, he does mean well, and is clever and resourceful.
 Paul Frees as Meowrice, a slim tuxedo cat and the main villain of the film. He is devious, shrewd, sly and willing to hurt others for his own personal gain. Frees also plays the voice of the cat from the railway station.
 Hermione Gingold as Mme. Rubens-Chatte, Meowrice's "sister" and a Persian cat. She is amply-contoured, crafty, and assertive. 
 Morey Amsterdam as Narrator and Man on Ship.
 Mel Blanc as Bulldog and additional voices.
 The Mellomen as Meowrice's business partners (singing voices).
 Julie Bennett and Joan Gardner as two ladies from Provence.
 Thurl Ravenscroft as Singing Hench Cat (uncredited).

Production
Gay Purr-ee was the second and final feature film, following 1001 Arabian Nights with Mr. Magoo, produced by UPA (United Productions of America), a studio which had revolutionized animation during the 1950s by incorporating design and limited animation.

The script for Gay Purr-ee was written by Dorothy Webster Jones and her husband, Warner Bros. Cartoons veteran director Chuck Jones. One of the former animators from his Warner Bros. unit, Abe Levitow, directed the film. According to the production notes on the DVD edition, it was Garland who suggested that her Wizard of Oz songwriters, Harold Arlen and E.Y. Harburg, should write and compose the songs for Gay Purr-ee.

When Warner Bros. picked up the film for distribution, they discovered that Chuck Jones had worked on the film. After a long debate with management over the details of Jones' exclusivity agreement, Warner fired Jones in July 1962 and laid off his staff after they had finished their next cartoon. Later, after Warner Bros. Cartoons was closed, Jones hired his old unit for his first independent studio, Sib Tower 12 Productions.

Release and reception
Gay Purr-ee was theatrically released on December 17, 1962. It received positive reviews from film critics who praised Garland's performance.

A Newsweek review felt that the film's subject matter was too sophisticated for an animated film, drily noting that its target audience seemed to be "the fey four-year-old of recherché taste".

A review by Jerry Beck in his 2005 book The Animated Movie Guide calls Gay Pur-ee "a good effort" and "unjustly underrated". He found that UPA's characteristic visual style was still present. Beck draws a similarity between Chuck Jones' later facial animation style and character eyes in Gay Purr-ee. Despite its "strong design sense" and voice cast, he agrees the animation quality is sometimes "on a television level or worse".

Multiple analyses have noted its modernist style, called "remarkably designed" in one such review.

One analysis claims the modernist aesthetic has plot implications: though both urban and pastoral landscapes are equally "highlighted", the plot praises the triumph of "pastoral nature over corrupt urban technology".

Home media
Gay Pur-ee released on VHS and LaserDisc in 1991 by Warner Home Video (under the Warner Bros. Family Entertainment label).
The film was reissued on VHS in 1992 and 1994, then released on DVD for the first time in 2003, and later also re-released on DVD in 2014 as a manufactured-on-demand (MOD) title from the Warner Archive collection. It has been released in HD on streaming services.

Soundtrack

On November 4, 2003, Rhino Handmade, a division of the Warner Music Group, released the soundtrack on CD. This was identical to the 1962 LP version but contained 5 additional demo tracks. The demo tracks are performed by Harold Arlen and E. Y. "Yip" Harburg, the composers of the songs for the movie. They were also the primary songwriters for the music of The Wizard of Oz, the 1939 Garland feature. Garland stated that the song "Little Drops of Rain" was one of her favorite songs. The CD track listing is as follows:

 Overture – Judy Garland and Chorus (3:59)
 Mewsette – Robert Goulet (3:09)
 Take My Hand, Paree – Judy Garland (2:58)
 Roses Red, Violets Blue – Judy Garland (2:02)
 The Money Cat – Paul Frees and the Mellomen (2:17)
 The Horse Won't Talk – Paul Frees (1:45)
 Bubbles – Robert Goulet, Red Buttons, and the Mellomen (2:48)
 Little Drops of Rain – Judy Garland (3:29)
 Little Drops of Rain – Robert Goulet (1:30)
 Portrait of Mewsette – Orchestra (3:30)
 Paris is a Lonely Town – Judy Garland (4:15)
 Mewsette Finale – Judy Garland, Robert Goulet, and Chorus (2:38)
 Paris is a Lonely Town (variation) – Orchestra (1:58)
 Roses Red, Violets Blue (demo) – Harold Arlen and E. Y. "Yip" Harburg (1:43)
 The Money Cat (demo) – Harold Arlen and E. Y. "Yip" Harburg (2:10)
 The Horse Won't Talk (demo) – Harold Arlen (3:46)
 Little Drops of Rain (demo) – Harold Arlen (2:39)
 Paris is a Lonely Town (demo) – Harold Arlen (2:46)

See also
 List of American films of 1962
 The Aristocats
 A Cat in Paris

References

External links

 
 
 
 
 Gay Purr-ee at Don Markstein's Toonopedia. Archived from the original on August 3, 2016.
 The Judy Garland Online Discography "Gay Purr-ee" pages.

1962 films
1962 musical comedy films
1962 animated films
American children's animated comedy films
American children's animated musical films
1960s English-language films
1960s American animated films
Warner Bros. animated films
Films set in 1895
Films set in the 19th century
Animated films about cats
Animated films set in Paris
Films directed by Abe Levitow
UPA films
Warner Bros. films
1960s children's animated films